Gmina Krzczonów is a rural gmina (administrative district) in Lublin County, Lublin Voivodeship, in eastern Poland.

Villages
Gmina Krzczonów contains the villages and settlements of Antoniówka, Boży Dar, Gierniak, Kosarzew Dolny, Kosarzew Górny, Kosarzew-Stróża, Krzczonów, Krzczonów Drugi, Krzczonów Pierwszy, Krzczonów Trzeci, Krzczonów-Folwark, Krzczonów-Skałka, Lewandowszczyzna, Majdan Policki, Nowiny Żukowskie, Olszanka, Piotrkówek, Policzyzna, Pustelnik, Sobieska Wola Pierwsza, Sobieska Wola Druga, Teklin, Walentynów, Zielona, Żuków Drugi, Żuków Pierwszy and Żuków-Kolonia.

Neighbouring gminas
Gmina Krzczonów is bordered by the gminas of Bychawa, Jabłonna, Piaski, Rybczewice, Wysokie and Żółkiewka.

References

Krzczonow
Lublin County